Two ships of the Royal Australian Navy have been named HMAS Glenelg, after the city of Glenelg, South Australia:

, a  commissioned in 1942, decommissioned in 1946, and sold for scrap in 1957
, an Armidale-class patrol boat commissioned in 2008, and active as of 2016

Battle honours
Ships named HMAS Glenelg are entitled to carry two battle honours:
 Pacific 1942–45
 New Guinea 1943–44

References

Royal Australian Navy ship names